Qayed Ali (also Romanized as Qāyed ‘Alī and Qā’ed ‘Alī) is a village in Padena-ye Sofla Rural District, Padena District, Semirom County, Isfahan Province, Iran. At the 2006 census, its population was 17, in 4 families.

References 

Populated places in Semirom County